WLEZ (99.3 FM) is a radio station branded as K-Love, a non-commercial Christian adult contemporary radio station  format. Licensed to Lebanon Junction, Kentucky, United States, the station is currently owned by Educational Media Foundation.

History
The station went on the air October 17, 1979, as WOKH on 96.7 MHz in Bardstown. Befitting its call letters, the first song played on the station was My Old Kentucky Home. It changed its call sign to WTHX on October 2, 2002. On August 4, 2008, the station changed its call sign to WKMO, and on June 18, 2022, it switched to WLEZ-FM.

In 2015, the station adopted the Nash Icon brand. It later reverted back to its previous name of "KMO Country 99.3".

In 2022, Commonwealth Broadcasting filed to sell WKMO, which was renamed WLEZ-FM before the sale, to the Educational Media Foundation for $410,000. WKMO's programming and call sign moved to the former WVKB at 101.5 MHz. On August 1, the last song on WKMO was  “Country Girl (Shake It For Me) by Luke Bryan”. The sale to Educational Media Foundation was consummated on November 1, 2022, and the station changed its call sign to WLEZ on November 10, 2022..

Former logo

References

External links
993nashicon facebook page

LEZ
1980 establishments in Kentucky
Radio stations established in 1980
Contemporary Christian radio stations in the United States